The Southwestern Mande languages are a branch of the Mande languages spoken in Sierra Leone, Guinea, and Liberia. There are around 2.8 million speakers, chiefly in Sierra Leone, due to Mende, the language with the most overall speakers. The Southwestern Mande languages are distantly related to the historic Manding languages.

Member languages
 Mende, spoken by 1.4 million in the Southern and Eastern provinces, Sierra Leone
 Loko, spoken by around 140,000 predominantly in Bombali and Port Loko districts, Sierra Leone.
 Kpelle, spoken by around 1.2 million in central Liberia and Guinée forestière, Guinea.
 Loma, or Toma, spoken by around 300,000 in Guinea and Liberia.
 Zialo, once classified as a dialect of Loma, spoken by around 25,000 around Macenta and Guéckédougou, Guinea.
 Gbandi, spoken by around 100,000 in Liberia.

Classification
A likely internal classification is as follows.

References

Mande languages
Languages of Guinea
Languages of Liberia
Languages of Sierra Leone